"Chimes of Liberty" is a military march by Edwin Franko Goldman (1878–1956). It vies with "On the Mall" (another march) as Goldman's greatest hit.  

Many think "Chimes of Liberty" is a re-working of the Liberty Bell (march) by John Philip Sousa; however, although the influence of Sousa on Goldman is unquestionable, the two marches are totally different, being written by different composers, each with a different tone. Nonetheless (like Sousa's "Liberty Bell") Goldman's "Chimes of Liberty" does use chimes. It follows the regular march pattern: IAABBCDCDC. This march was written prior to 1922, when Goldman recorded it for the Victor Talking Machine Company, but he revised it at least once before publishing the 1937 edition now largely in use.

External links 
 "Chimes of Liberty" 1922 piano and voice edition with MIDI sequence and access to free online sheet music
 "Chimes of Liberty" 2007 Purdue University Symphonic Band

1922 compositions
American military marches